Simon Beaufoy (born 26 December 1966) is a British screenwriter. Born in Keighley, West Riding of Yorkshire, he was educated at Malsis School in Cross Hills, Ermysted's Grammar School and Sedbergh School, he read English at St Peter's College, Oxford and graduated from Arts University Bournemouth. In 1997, he earned an Oscar nomination for Best Original Screenplay for The Full Monty. He went on to win the 2009 Academy Award for Best Adapted Screenplay for Slumdog Millionaire as well as winning a Golden Globe and a BAFTA award.

Beaufoy has recently completed adaptations of The Raw Shark Texts by Steven Hall, Salmon Fishing in the Yemen by Paul Torday, and a new adaptation of The Full Monty as a stage play.

In March 2014, Spanner Films announced that Beaufoy will be one of the writers for Undercovers, a television drama series about the undercover police officers who spied on activists, and the women who unknowingly had long-term relationships and even children with the spies.

Filmography
Yellow (1996) (short film)
The Full Monty (1997)
Among Giants (1998)
Closer (1998) (short film) 
The Darkest Light (1999)
This Is Not a Love Song (2001)
Blow Dry (2001)
Yasmin (2004)
Miss Pettigrew Lives for a Day (2008)
Burn Up (2008) (miniseries)
Slumdog Millionaire (2008) (won an Academy Award for Best Adapted Screenplay, a BAFTA Award for Best Adapted Screenplay, and a Golden Globe Award for Best Screenplay)
127 Hours (2010)
Salmon Fishing in the Yemen (2011)
The Hunger Games: Catching Fire (2013)
Everest (2015)
Battle of the Sexes (2017)
 Trust (2018) (TV series)
The Spy Who Came in from the Cold (TBA) (TV miniseries) (adaptation)

References

External links

 Slumdog Millionaire

1966 births
Best Adapted Screenplay Academy Award winners
Best Adapted Screenplay BAFTA Award winners
British male screenwriters
Living people
People educated at Sedbergh School
People educated at Malsis School
People from Keighley
Writers Guild of America Award winners
Alumni of St Peter's College, Oxford
People educated at Ermysted's Grammar School
Alumni of Arts University Bournemouth
Best Screenplay Golden Globe winners